76 (formerly Union 76) is a chain of gas stations located within the United States. The 76 brand is owned by Phillips 66. Unocal, the original owner and creator of the 76 brand, merged with Chevron Corporation in 2005.

History 

The Union Oil Company of California (later known as Unocal) introduced the Union 76 brand to their existing Union Oil service stations in 1932. After expanding along the West Coast, the Union 76 brand expanded to the Midwest and Southeast through the acquisition of Pure Oil in 1965.

In 1989, Unocal began to gradually exit the Midwest and Eastern markets by forming a joint venture with PDVSA, called Uno-Ven, in which Unocal contributed its Midwest refining and marketing assets. Unocal sold its interest in Uno-Ven to PDVSA in 1997 and PDVSA rebranded the Midwestern and Eastern Union 76 stations to its Citgo brand.

In 1997, Unocal also sold its remaining refining and marketing operations in the western United States and the rights to the Union 76 brand for use in refining and marketing operations to Tosco. Four years later, Phillips Petroleum purchased Tosco along with the 76 brand in 2001. Phillips merged with Conoco the following year to form ConocoPhillips.

In 2012, ConocoPhillips divested its refining and marketing business, which included the 76 brand, through the formation of Phillips 66.

In 2016, Saudi Aramco-owned Motiva Enterprises signed a deal with Phillips 66 Company which would allow Motiva to use the 76 brand on some of its stations in its 26 eastern and Gulf Coast states operating territory. By 2017, the 76 brand was reintroduced into New York, Georgia, Texas, Tennessee and New Jersey.

Marketing
76, Conoco, and Phillips 66 market their brand of gasoline under the brand name PROclean. The previous brand name for their gasoline was Propower. 76 gasoline stopped being marketed under the Propower name after the termination of the commercial relationship between NASCAR and 76 after the end of the 2003 season, when the firm discontinued all motorsport fuels. As of October 2004, PROclean brand fuel was included on the list of fuels recognized as "Top Tier".

In the 1970s and 1980s, the company used the slogan "Go With the Spirit...the Spirit of '76." This was later shortened to "Get the Spirit". Their current (as of late 2021) slogan is “We’re on the driver’s side”.

The orange ball

Union Oil, for many years based in El Segundo, California, introduced "76" gasoline in 1932. The name referred to the 1776 United States Declaration of Independence, and was also the octane rating of the gasoline in 1932.

76 signs are orange balls with a 76 legend in blue. Many stations had the 76 ball rotate when the signs were illuminated. The first such sign was designed in 1962 by advertising creative director Ray Pedersen for the Seattle World's Fair.

In 2005, new corporate owners ConocoPhillips began a rebranding campaign to unify the design elements of each of the merged brands (76, Phillips, and Conoco), which included replacing all the orange-ball signs with monument-style signs in the red-orange and blue color scheme. In response to negative publicity generated by a grassroots "Save The 76 Ball" campaign, ConocoPhillips reversed this decision in January 2007, and agreed to donate several classic orange 76 balls to museums and to erect approximately 100 balls in the new red-orange and blue color scheme.

The 76 ball is a popular logo in the "Cult Style" of European car tuning (especially on Volkswagen Golf Mk1 GTIs, due to the debut year of 1976), and it is used on clothing items in Japan as of 2005.

Until the end of 2003, 76 balls were located at the Daytona International Speedway and Talladega Superspeedway in all four of its turns and at other NASCAR tracks, plus it was on the checkered flag when 76 was the official fuel of NASCAR. They were used as scoring points, had portholes, and were capable of holding a few people inside. One of these balls was given to the owner of Brumos Motor Cars in Jacksonville, Florida, and now sits atop a building on the premises after ConocoPhillips terminated its NASCAR sponsorship. Another was given to Dale Earnhardt Jr. and is currently displayed on his property. Similar balls were near pit entrances at most NASCAR circuits until the sponsorship ended, but unlike spheres, they were flat on both sides and illuminated at night during races.

The 76 ball is also a landmark at Dodger Stadium in Los Angeles, where the only gas station on the premises of a major league ballpark is visible from the park beyond the outfield stands. 76 ball logos also adorn the baseball field's on-deck circles. Union Oil was a longtime sponsor of the Dodgers baseball team, beginning with their relocation to Los Angeles from Brooklyn in 1958. The sponsorship by the 76 brand continues to this day.

Beginning in 1967, Union 76 distributed tens of millions of small orange foam balls with the 76 logo, meant to be impaled on the radio antenna of a car. These were popular especially in the Greater Los Angeles area, where they are still seen. In the winter of 1968, wind and snow created drifts in Spokane, Washington made it difficult to locate cars without whip antennas and the orange 76 ball on them.

In recent years, 76 has appeared in certain areas in the eastern United States, as part of a licensing deal with Motiva Enterprises. Since 2013, they have returned to the orange ball imagery as part of the "Experience 76" program.

See also
 List of automotive fuel brands
 Convenience store

References

External links

 

Phillips 66
Union Oil Company of California
Automotive fuel retailers
Economy of the Northwestern United States
Economy of the Southwestern United States
Retail companies established in 1932
Energy companies established in 1932
Gas stations in the United States
1932 establishments in the United States